Makhad (Urdu: مکھڈ ) aka Makhad Shareef is a historical town in Attock District of northern Punjab Province in Pakistan. It is one of the last towns separating the Punjab from the Khyber Pakhtunkhwa. 

The boundary is marked by the fast-flowing Indus River. The town came under the power of Muhammad Sheraz before arrival of British East India Company.

References

Cities and towns in Attock District